Karen van der Kooij (born 26 December 1963) is a Dutch sprinter. She competed in the women's 4 × 100 metres relay at the 1992 Summer Olympics.

References

External links
 

1963 births
Living people
Athletes (track and field) at the 1992 Summer Olympics
Dutch female sprinters
Olympic athletes of the Netherlands
Sportspeople from The Hague
Olympic female sprinters